"Black Black Heart" is a song written by David Usher and Jeff Pearce and released as the second single off Usher's 2001 album, Morning Orbit. It became a minor hit in Germany, the Netherlands, and Switzerland, and rose to number three in Greece, spending over 25 weeks on the country's singles chart. The music video won two MuchMusic Video Awards.

Overview
There are three versions of the song. The album and radio remix versions feature Julie Galios from the band My Brilliant Beast. The harder rock version, which was found as a hidden track on the album and is also referred to as "Black Black Heart 2.0", features vocals by Kim Bingham. The chorus samples The Flower Duet (Sous le dôme épais), a famous duet for sopranos from Léo Delibes' opera Lakmé, as a hook.

Music video
The music video for Black Black Heart features Usher singing the song in an apartment in a big house at night, with the scenes of him singing being intercut with various scenes showing other inhabitants of the house doing more or less usual things. It won two MuchMusic Video Awards for Best Post-Production (for Kurt Ritchie and Jeff Campbell) and Best Pop Video (for Usher) in 2002.

Track listing

Charts

Weekly charts

Year-end charts

Cover versions
Rene Liu and Stanley Huang recorded a Chinese version called Travel Separately (分开旅行 / Fēnkāi lǚxíng), but only with the lyrics changed and became a huge success. Usher and Pearce were credited for the song. Usher also made a version of the tune in French, with popular Québec singer Marie-Mai singing on the track, as a special guest.

References

2001 singles
2001 songs
EMI Records singles
Songs written by David Usher